Civil disobedience is the active refusal to obey certain laws, demands and commands of a government or of an occupying power, usually without resorting to physical violence. 

Civil disobedience may also refer to:
 Civil Disobedience (Thoreau), an essay by Henry David Thoreau, published in 1849
 Civil disobedience movement, Salt Satyagraha, led by Mahatma Gandhi during the Indian independence movement
 Civil Disobedience (album), a 2008 album by electro-industrial musical project Leæther Strip
"Civil Disobedience," a song by Camper Van Beethoven from their album New Roman Times
"Civil Disobedience," a song by Throwing Muses from their 2003 album Throwing Muses